California Crossing is an album by the American stoner rock band Fu Manchu, released in 2001 through Mammoth Records.

Production
The album was produced by Matt Hyde, who encouraged Fu Manchu to spend more time on preproduction and song arrangements. The band pushed the vocals higher in the mix for the album, worked on backing vocals, and tried to keep most of the tracks around three minutes. Circle Jerks singer Keith Morris provides vocals on "Bultaco".

Drummer Brant Bjork departed the band after the recording of the album.

Critical reception
The Guardian deemed the album "a strangely nihilistic celebration of all things Cali." NME wrote that Fu Manchu "are the stoned Ramones, a matey Motorhead: a band who can rewrite that album into the infinite future and rule perpetually." The Washington Post thought that "more than anything else, it's the band's cartoonish perspective that keeps Crossing from flagging." USA Today called the songs "rooted in mad propulsion, clean sonics and Scott Hill's atonal holler."

Track listing

Personnel 
Scott Hill – vocals, guitar
Brant Bjork – drums
Bob Balch – guitar
Brad Davis – bass
Matt Hyde – mixer, producer

Production 
Vocals on "Bultaco" by Keith Morris
Backing vocals by Fu Manchu
Engineered by Nick Raskulinecz
Recorded at Sound City, Van Nuys, CA
Vocals recorded at Aftermath, Laguna, CA
Mixed at Henson Studios, Los Angeles, CA
Mastered by Dave Collins at Steve Marcussen Mastering, Hollywood, CA
Enhanced CD footage filmed by Ken Pucci

All songs written by Fu Manchu, except "California Crossing", lyrics by Rodney Skelton.

Charts

References

2001 albums
Fu Manchu (band) albums
Mammoth Records albums
Albums produced by Matt Hyde
Albums recorded at Sound City Studios